Admiral Robert Montague (1763 – 27 November 1830) was a Royal Navy officer who became Commander-in-Chief of the Jamaica Station.

Naval career
Born the son of John Montagu, 4th Earl of Sandwich and Martha Ray, Montague was promoted to post captain in March 1781 on his appointment to the command of the sixth-rate HMS Seahorse in which he saw action at the Battle of Sadras in February 1782 during the Anglo-French War and again at the Battle of Providien in April 1782 during the American Revolutionary War. He transferred to the command of the third-rate HMS Exeter in May 1782 in which he saw action at the Battle of Negapatam in July 1782, the Battle of Trincomalee in September 1782 and the Siege of Cuddalore in June 1783. He went on to serve as Commander-in-Chief of the Jamaica Station in 1802. He died in Cheltenham in 1830.

References

Sources

Royal Navy admirals
1763 births
1830 deaths